The Men's Indoor Hockey Asia Cup is an international men's indoor hockey competition organized by the Asian Hockey Federation. The winning team becomes the champion of Asia. The tournament serves as a qualification tournament for the Indoor Hockey World Cup.

Results

Medal table

Team appearances

See also
 Indoor hockey at the Asian Indoor and Martial Arts Games
 Men's Hockey Asia Cup
 Women's Indoor Hockey Asia Cup

References

External links
 Asia Cup 

 
International field hockey competitions in Asia
Asian championships
Recurring sporting events established in 2008
Asia